Joan Carr-Wiggin is a Canadian independent filmmaker who has worked as a writer, director, and producer. She began working as a filmmaker in her 40s in the early 1990s after a career as an economist and a novelist.

She is married to producer David Gordian, her frequent collaborator. Previously based in Victoria, the two now reside in Toronto. The two got their start with 1994's Sleeping with Strangers, an independent film starring Adrienne Shelly.

In a guest post for IndieWire, she spoke of the barriers women face in the industry:So many young men on set—sometimes I fear it's 100% of them—are convinced they can be the next Orson Welles. Yet when I ask smart, capable young women working on set, "Hey, why don't you think about directing?" most of them immediately reply, "Oh I could never do that." Why do they think that? They think that because too many people are saying women can't do the job. Or can only do it when the circumstances are perfect, or if it's a certain kind of movie, or if they don't have children…

Filmography 

 Getting to Know You (2019) 
 The Bet (2018) 
 Love of My Life (2017)
 Happily Ever After (2016)
 If I Were You (2012)
 A Previous Engagement (2008) (writer)
 My First Wedding (2006) (writer)
 Honeymoon (1997)
 Sleeping with Strangers (1994) (writer)

References

Living people
Year of birth missing (living people)
Place of birth missing (living people)
Film directors from British Columbia
Canadian women film producers
Canadian women film directors
Canadian women screenwriters
20th-century Canadian screenwriters
21st-century Canadian screenwriters
20th-century Canadian women writers
21st-century Canadian women writers